Vonn Christian Bell (born December 12, 1994) is an American football safety for the Carolina Panthers of the National Football League (NFL). He played college football at Ohio State and was drafted by the New Orleans Saints in the second round of the 2016 NFL Draft.

Early years
Bell's first two years of high school were at Chattanooga Central High School in Harrison, Tennessee, where he received all district honors. Bell then attended Ridgeland High School in Rossville, Georgia. In Bell's senior year he led Ridgeland to the Georgia class AAAA state championship game but lost to Sandy Creek 41–10. He was rated by both Rivals.com and Scout.com as a five-star recruit and was ranked the number two safety in the country. Bell was rated as a five-star recruit by 247 Sports and a high four-star by ESPN who rated him as the 50th best player overall in the nation regardless of position. Bell was selected to play in the 2013 Under Armour All-American game. On February 6, 2013, he committed to Ohio State University.

College career
Bell played in all 13 games as a backup his freshman season in 2013, but made his first career start on January 3, 2014 in the Discover Orange Bowl where he recorded his first collegiate interception. Bell became a full-time starter for the Buckeyes his sophomore season in 2014. He played in all 15 games recording 91 tackles and a conference-leading six interceptions. In the 2015 College Football Playoff National Championship victory over Oregon, he recorded six tackles and a sack.

Professional career
Bell attended the NFL Scouting Combine in Indianapolis, Indiana, but opted to skip the combine drills due to a hamstring injury. He chose to only meet with team representatives and had his measurements and weight taken. On March 11, 2016, he attended Ohio State's pro day and performed the 40-yard dash, 20-yard dash, 10-yard dash, and vertical drill for scouts and team representatives. He also attended private workouts and visits with multiple teams, including the Minnesota Vikings, Buffalo Bills, Atlanta Falcons, Los Angeles Rams, Tampa Bay Buccaneers, Jacksonville Jaguars, Pittsburgh Steelers, and Tennessee Titans among others. Bell was projected to be a second round pick by NFL Draft experts and scouts. He was ranked the second best safety prospect in the draft by NFL analyst Mike Mayock and ESPN, the third best strong safety by DraftScout.com, and was ranked the 11th best defensive back by Sports Illustrated.

New Orleans Saints
The New Orleans Saints selected Bell in the second round (61st overall) of the 2016 NFL Draft. They traded their third-round (78th overall) and fourth-round (112th overall) selections to the New England Patriots in order to move up to the 61st pick, which the Patriots acquired in a trade that sent Chandler Jones to the Arizona Cardinals in exchange for the pick and Jonathan Cooper. The Saints then selected Bell. The Patriots went on to select NC State's Joe Thuney and Georgia's Malcolm Mitchell with their acquired selections.

2016 season: Rookie year
On May 10, 2016, the Saints signed Bell to a four-year, $3.97 million contract that includes a signing bonus of $1.08 million.

Throughout training camp, Bell competed to be the starting free safety against veteran Jairus Byrd. He joined a group of established veteran safeties, including Jairus Byrd, Kenny Vaccaro, and Roman Harper. Head coach Sean Payton named Bell the backup free safety behind Byrd to start the regular season.

Bell made his NFL debut in the Saints' season-opening 35–34 loss to the Oakland Raiders. The following week, he made his first NFL start as a nickel back and recorded a season-high nine combined tackles during a 16–13 road loss against the New York Giants. Bell made his first NFL tackle on wide receiver Sterling Shepard after Shepard caught a five-yard pass on the Giants' first offensive snap. During Week 9, Bell recorded six combined tackles and was credited with half a sack during a 41–23 road victory over the San Francisco 49ers. He made his first sack with teammate Cameron Jordan, as they tackled Colin Kaepernick for a five-yard loss in the third quarter. In Week 15, Bell tied his season-high of nine combined tackles and forced a fumble in a 48–41 road victory over the Arizona Cardinals.

Bell finished his rookie year with 87 combined tackles (61 solo), four pass deflections, two forced fumbles, and a sack in 16 games and 14 starts. He was inconsistent throughout his rookie season and supplanted Byrd at free safety for a brief period at the beginning of the season before losing the role due to issues in pass coverage. He started two games at free safety and started 12 as either a nickel back or third safety in Dennis Allen's third-safety technique.

2017 season
During training camp, Bell competed against rookie Marcus Williams for the job as the starting free safety. Head coach Sean Payton officially named him the starter to begin the regular season, alongside strong safety Kenny Vaccaro.

During Week 6, Bell recorded five combined tackles and made his first solo sack on Matthew Stafford during a 52–38 win against the Detroit Lions. In Week 11, he collected a season-high 13 combined tackles (ten solo) and a sack in a 34–31 victory over the Washington Redskins. The following week, Bell made 11 combined tackles (nine solo) and sacked Jared Goff once during a 26–20 road loss against the Los Angeles Rams.

Bell finished his second professional season with 83 combined tackles (62 solo), 4.5 sacks, and two pass deflections in 16 games and ten starts. Pro Football Focus gave Bell an overall grade of 68.7, ranking him 65th among all qualifying safeties in 2017.

The Saints finished atop the NFC South with an 11–5 record. On January 7, 2018, Bell started in his first NFL playoff game and recorded nine combined tackles and sacked Cam Newton in a 31–26 victory against the Carolina Panthers in the NFC Wildcard Game. The following week, he made eight solo tackles during a 29–24 road loss against the Minnesota Vikings in the NFC Divisional Round.

2018 season

Throughout training camp, Bell competed against Kurt Coleman to be the starting strong safety. Head coach Sean Payton named Bell the backup strong safety to begin the regular season. During Week 16, he collected a season-high ten combined tackles (seven solo) during a 31–28 victory against the Pittsburgh Steelers.

Bell finished his third season with a career-high 89 combined tackles (63 solo), three pass deflections, one sack, and one forced fumble in 16 games and eight starts. Bell shared the starting strong safety role with Kurt Coleman in 2018 and was also the nickel back in packages the required five defensive backs. Bell received an overall grade of 74.3 from Pro Football Focus in 2018, which ranked 24th among all qualified safeties.

2019 season
During a Week 3 33–27 road victory over the Seattle Seahawks, Bell recorded 9 tackles and recovered a fumble by running back Chris Carson, which he returned for his first NFL touchdown. In the next game against the Dallas Cowboys, Bell forced a fumble off of running back Ezekiel Elliott in the narrow 12–10 victory. During Week 7 against the Chicago Bears, Bell recorded a team high eight tackles and forced a fumble on wide receiver Anthony Miller and recovered it in the 36–25 road victory. During Week 14 against the San Francisco 49ers, Bell recorded a team high 13 tackles and sacked Jimmy Garoppolo once during the narrow 48–46 loss.

Cincinnati Bengals
On March 26, 2020, Bell signed a three-year, $18 million contract with the Cincinnati Bengals.

Against the Kansas City Chiefs in the AFC Championship, Bell recorded an interception off Patrick Mahomes in overtime, helping the Bengals win 27–24 and advancing to Super Bowl LVI.

Carolina Panthers
On March 15, 2023, Bell signed with the Carolina Panthers.

NFL career statistics

Regular season

Postseason

Personal life
Bell's older brother Volonte Bell was an assistant coach at Chattanooga State Community College. Volonte Bell was killed in a car accident on February 24, 2020.

References

External links
 Cincinnati Bengals bio
 Ohio State Buckeyes bio

1994 births
Living people
American football safeties
Cincinnati Bengals players
Ohio State Buckeyes football players
New Orleans Saints players
People from Rossville, Georgia
Players of American football from Georgia (U.S. state)